Milko (Cyrillic script: Милко) is a Slavic name that may refer to:

Given name
Milko Bambič (1905–1991), Slovene illustrator, cartoonist, caricaturist, inventor and painter
Milko Bjelica (born 1984), Serbian professional basketball player
Milko Bobotsov (1931–2000), Bulgarian chess grandmaster 
Milko Brezigar (1886–1958), Slovene liberal economist
Milko Campus (born 1969), Italian long jumper
Milko Đurovski (born 1963), Yugoslav and Macedonian football coach and former player
Milko Foucault-Larche (born 1960), Mauritian Australian entertainer
Milko Gaydarski (1946–1989), Bulgarian football player
Milko Gjurovski (born 1963), Macedonian football player and manager
Milko Kalaidjiev, Bulgarian pop-folk singer
Milko Kazanov (born 1970), Bulgarian flatwater canoer
Milko Kelemen (1924–2018), Croatian composer
Milko Novaković (born 1988), is a Serbian-born Montenegrin football player
Milko Šparemblek (born 1928), Croatian dancer, choreographer and director

Surname
Jean Milko, American politician
Vadym Milko, Ukrainian football midfielder

Slavic masculine given names
Bulgarian masculine given names
Serbian masculine given names
Slovene masculine given names
Croatian masculine given names